"Silent Despair" is a song by Finnish singer Anna Abreu from her second studio album, Now (2008). Rauli Eskolin (known professionally as Rake) co-wrote the song with Patric Sarin and Abreu. The single marked Abreu's first release to credit her as a songwriter. "Silent Despair" was produced by Eskolin at Inkfish Studios, Helsinki and is a pop ballad. The song was released on 6 October 2008 in Finland, as the album's second single, two weeks before the release of the album.

Lyrical content
"Silent Depair" is a melancholic ballad that focuses upon a relationship that has become tainted and filled with 'silent despair' - unspoken but negative feelings. Abreu sings 'I couldn't stand losing you' and struggles to accept the inevitability of the relationship's end. The crumbling of the relationship is compared to 'no sun shining after the rain' and 'no laughter to conquer the pain'.

Chart performance
Released mainly to promote the album, "Silent Despair" did not chart on the Top 20 Singles but it did peak at number twenty-five on Finland's Download Chart. It also performed very weel on radio, reaching number two on the Airplay Chart.

Music video
The music video for "Silent Despair" was directed by Misko Iho and takes place in what appears to be Abreu's apartment. The video features shots of Abreu lying on the couch and in the bathtub singing. This is interspersed with reverse slow-motion shots of a shattered wine reforming and going back into Abreu's outstretched hand, revealing that she threw it against the wall in anger after her partner left her.

Live performances
"Silent Despair" has become a regular song performed by Abreu at her concerts. Although not on every date, she has performed the song on almost every tour, from 2008's Now Tour to 2014's V Tour.

Track listing
"Silent Despair" – 3:57

Credits and personnel

Songwriting – Patric Sarin, Rauli Eskolin, Anna Abreu
Production - Rauli Eskolin
Engineering - Rauli Eskolin (at Inkfish Studios: Helsinki, Finland)
Instruments - Rauli Eskolin

Lead vocals - Anna Abreu
Backing vocals - Anna Abreu
Mixing - Rauli Eskolin

Release history

References

2008 singles
2008 songs
Anna Abreu songs
Songs written by Patric Sarin
Songs written by Rauli Eskolin
RCA Records singles